John Philip "Little Clipper" Smith (December 12, 1904 – May 11, 1973) was an American football player, coach, and college athletics administrator.  He played college football as a guard at the University of Notre Dame under Knute Rockne.  Smith was a consensus All-American in 1927.  He later served as the head coach at North Carolina State University from 1931 to 1933 and at Duquesne University from 1936 to 1938, compiling a career record of 28–24–5.  Smith was inducted into the College Football Hall of Fame as a player in 1975.  He died on May 11, 1973 in West Hartford, Connecticut just before a National Football Foundation awards dinner that was to have honored him.

Head coaching record

College

References

External links
 
 
 

1904 births
1973 deaths
American football guards
Duquesne Dukes athletic directors
Duquesne Dukes football coaches
Georgetown Hoyas football coaches
NC State Wolfpack football coaches
Notre Dame Fighting Irish football coaches
Notre Dame Fighting Irish football players
Trinity Bantams football coaches
High school football coaches in New Jersey
All-American college football players
College Football Hall of Fame inductees
Sportspeople from Hartford, Connecticut
Coaches of American football from Connecticut
Players of American football from Hartford, Connecticut